The men's discus throw at the 2012 World Junior Championships in Athletics was held at the Estadi Olímpic Lluís Companys on 10 and 12 July.

Medalists

Records
, the existing world junior and championship records were as follows.

Results

Qualification

Qualification: Standard 59.40 m (Q) or at least best 12 qualified (q)

Final

Participation
According to an unofficial count, 28 athletes from 22 countries participated in the event.

References

External links
WJC12 discus throw schedule

Discus Throw
Discus throw at the World Athletics U20 Championships